Irina Alexandrova (born 2 October 1994) is a Kazakhstani handball player for USC Dostyk and the Kazakhstani national team.

She competed at the 2015 World Women's Handball Championship in Denmark.

References

1994 births
Living people
Kazakhstani female handball players
Handball players at the 2014 Asian Games
Handball players at the 2018 Asian Games
Asian Games bronze medalists for Kazakhstan
Asian Games medalists in handball
Medalists at the 2014 Asian Games
21st-century Kazakhstani women